Ricardo Zúñiga Carrasco (born 17 September 1957) is a Spanish former professional racing cyclist. He rode in one edition of the Tour de France and eight editions of the Vuelta a España.

Major results
1979
 10th Overall Volta a Catalunya
1st Stage 5
1980
 1st Stage 1 Vuelta a los Valles Mineros
1981
 8th Overall Vuelta a Andalucía
 10th Overall Volta a Catalunya
1983
 3rd Clásica de Sabiñánigo
 8th Overall Vuelta a Andalucía

References

External links
 

1957 births
Living people
Spanish male cyclists
Sportspeople from Sabadell
Cyclists from Catalonia
20th-century Spanish people